Angus is a city in Navarro County, Texas, United States. The population was 414 at the 2010 census.

Geography

Angus is located at  (31.988851, –96.424350).

Demographics

As of the census of 2000, there were 334 people, 129 households, and 97 families residing in the city. The population density was 101.5 people per square mile (39.2/km2). There were 139 housing units at an average density of 42.3 per square mile (16.3/km2). The racial makeup of the city was 88.32% White, 1.80% African American, 1.80% Asian, 0.60% Pacific Islander, 2.99% from other races, and 4.49% from two or more races. Hispanic or Latino of any race were 7.78% of the population.

There were 129 households, out of which 33.3% had children under the age of 18 living with them, 68.2% were married couples living together, 7.0% had a female householder with no husband present, and 24.8% were non-families. 19.4% of all households were made up of individuals, and 9.3% had someone living alone who was 65 years of age or older. The average household size was 2.59 and the average family size was 2.99.

In the city, the population was spread out, with 26.3% under the age of 18, 6.6% from 18 to 24, 30.5% from 25 to 44, 24.3% from 45 to 64, and 12.3% who were 65 years of age or older. The median age was 38 years. For every 100 females, there were 103.7 males. For every 100 females age 18 and over, there were 105.0 males.

The median income for a household in the city was $36,944, and the median income for a family was $38,472. Males had a median income of $24,531 versus $20,179 for females. The per capita income for the city was $16,776. About 11.3% of families and 13.6% of the population were below the poverty line, including 17.1% of those under age 18 and 26.9% of those age 65 or over.

Education

The City of Angus is served by the Corsicana Independent School District.

References

Cities in Texas
Cities in Navarro County, Texas